Northwest Guilford High School is a public high school in Guilford County, North Carolina. It currently has an enrollment of 1,947 students in grades 9 through 12.

The school was ranked by Newsweeks Best High Schools in America as 261st among American high schools. The school also received an award from Siemens for its strength in Science and Math AP education, and was listed by High Schools That Work as one of the top 36 high schools in the United States.

Traditions 

Northwest has three dances during the school year: the Homecoming dance the Saturday night after the Homecoming football game on Friday, a TWIRP dance in the spring, and the Junior/Senior Prom.

Facilities 

Due to an increase in population in the area, several additions occurred at Northwest during the early 2000s, including the adaptation of a two-story educational building completed in 2002, a second gym completed in 2003, and a cultural arts wing.  Northwest now has the "Old Gym" and the "New Gym;" as well as two main buildings, the "Old Building" and the "New Building."

The original main building at the school, the "Old Building," serves primarily as the English, CTE, and Environmental Science building, and the Educational Building, or "New Building," serves primarily as the Mathematics, Foreign Language, Biology, and Physical Science building.

The Vocational Building houses classes such as Drafting, Technology, and Graphic Design, and trailers serve mostly as the Social Studies classrooms. The Vocational Building used to be the home of the school's Navy Junior Reserve Officers Training Corps (JROTC), until the program was decommissioned in the Spring of 2004.

A new field house, football field bleachers and track were opened to Northwest students in the fall of 2012. R. L. Billings Stadium now has a capacity of 5,000.

Academics 

Northwest has a large selection of Advanced Placement courses, including US History, Environmental Science, Calculus AB & BC, Physics, Statistics, World History, European History, Human Geography, Government, Psychology, Art 2D, Art 3D, Spanish Language, Spanish Literature, Latin, English Language & Composition, German Language and Composition, and English Literature. The school also has Honors and College Prep courses.

Northwest's school paper modified its name in 2007, from The Northwest Express to Northwest Horizons.

Athletics 
Northwest is a North Carolina High School Athletic Association (NCHSAA) 4A school, with sports programs in cross country, soccer, basketball, football, tennis, swimming, lacrosse, baseball, wrestling, tennis, track, field hockey, volleyball, rugby, and golf, among others.

Arts 
Northwest has a fine arts program, including concert and marching bands, orchestral ensembles, arts classes, drama department, and vocal ensembles.

Bands
Northwest has multiple band programs led by current band director Brian McMath and assistant director Kevin Greene. There are 3 class bands, Concert, Symphonic, and Wind Ensemble. The Marching band has become notable in the triad for its entertainment focused shows and quality. The band received 12th place in 2016 at the Bands of America regional competition with their show "Rise." The band also hosts a competition at the end of October called "Fall Festival." Many bands perform at the festival with 25 bands in 2021 and a record of 30+ in 2019. The School also has Winter ensembles such as Winter Percussion Ensemble and multiple winter guard groups that compete in CWEA regional events.

Theatre
Northwest's theatre arts department maintains a heavy emphasis on production, programming 3 mainstage shows and 2 "POPs" shows each season and typically including at least one musical theatre title. The program currently offers four unique theatre/drama classes centered on the NC Essential Standards; Theatre Arts I, II, III/IV, and Technical Theatre Arts. The school's theatre department is home to the International Thespian Society's Troupe 8010 and inducts new members into the society each spring.

Notable alumni
 Leah Naomi Green, poet who was winner of the Walt Whitman award of the Academy of American Poets in 2019
 Scott Houston, national champion pole vaulter who won at the 2018 USA Indoor Track and Field Championships
 Rusty LaRue, former NBA player and 1998 NBA Champion
 Mike Skeen, professional stock car racing driver

See also
Guilford County Schools
North Carolina Department of Public Instruction
North Carolina State Board of Education

References

External links
 Guilford County Schools

Public high schools in North Carolina
Schools in Greensboro, North Carolina